King Hall may refer to 
 UC Davis School of Law (King Hall)
 The mess hall at the United States Naval Academy
 Charles King Hall, British composer
 William King-Hall, British naval officer, father to George Fowler and Herbert King-Hall
 Herbert King-Hall, British naval officer, younger brother of George Fowler King-Hall
 Sir  George Fowler King-Hall, British naval officer, father of Magdalen, Lou and Stephen King-Hall
 Magdalen King-Hall, author and daughter of George Fowler King-Hall
 Stephen King-Hall, British naval officer and politician, son of George Fowler King-Hall